This is a List of Royal Air Force Communication units. "Communication" in the Royal Air Force sense meant units of light transport/liaison aircraft, very frequently supporting a command headquarters.

To allow rapid transport of air officers, staff and other important people many units and Headquarters operated communication Sections, Flights, Squadrons or wings.

A single wing of this type, the 2nd Tactical Air Force Communication Wing RAF, was established on 31 March 1945, and disbanded only three and a half months later at RAF Buckeburg on 15 July 1945, by being reduced to the British Air Forces of Occupation Communication Squadron.

Squadrons

Units

Flights

References

Citations

Bibliography

Transport units and formations of the Royal Air Force
Communications
Royal Air Force communications, list of